"Maria" is a song by American rock band Blondie. The song was written by Blondie keyboardist Jimmy Destri and produced by Craig Leon. Taken from their seventh album, No Exit (1999), it was Blondie's first new release since 1982. "Maria", issued as a single in Europe on January 11, 1999, reached number one in the United Kingdom; Blondie's sixth UK chart-topper. The song also topped the charts of Greece and Spain, becoming a top-20 hit across Europe and in New Zealand.

The song was included on the band's 2014 compilation album, Greatest Hits Deluxe Redux. The compilation was part of a two-disc set titled Blondie 4(0) Ever, which includes Ghosts of Download, their tenth studio album, and marked the 40th anniversary of the band's formation.

Background and composition
"Maria" was written by the band's keyboardist, Jimmy Destri, who had penned some of their earlier hits such as "Atomic". He wrote the song while reflecting on his days in Catholic school, when he fantasized about meeting the ideal girl. According to Destri, the track is about teenage desire. A line from the song: "...like a millionaire/walking on imported air", was used in the previous Blondie track "Walk Like Me" (also written by Destri) from the album Autoamerican (1980), and the track shares a similar lyrical motif with their 1977 single "Rip Her to Shreds". "Maria" is written and composed in the key of A major, with Harry's range in the song spanning from the low note of E3 to the high note of C5.

Release
"Maria" was serviced to all US radio formats on January 5, 1999, guitarist Chris Stein's 49th birthday. A CD release followed in Europe on January 11, 1999. In the United Kingdom, "Maria" was issued as a CD and cassette on February 1, 1999. The CD contains two remixes of the song, and the cassette contains only one of the remixes.

Critical reception
A reviewer from Billboard described the song as a "delectable track", and a "skillfully arranged array of passionate Debbie Harry vocals, great guitar and drum thrusts, and neat harmonica passages that climb into the toll of cathedral bells." It was also noted that "all these touches are in the service of a cool rock/pop intelligence powered by the street smarts that are the Blondie trademark." Scottish newspaper Daily Record commented, "Almost two decades after their last No 1, comeback stars Blondie have gone back to their 'new wave' roots" with "Maria". The Daily Vault's Mark Millan called it a "pop gem", that "kicks off". He added that the singer's "commanding performance" really shows off her impressive range, and stated that "this one is still one of their best singles to date." Troy J. Augusto from Variety declared it as an "infectious standout song".

Chart performance
"Maria" debuted at number one on the UK Singles Chart on February 7, 1999, giving Blondie their sixth UK number-one single and first chart-topper since "The Tide Is High" in November 1980. It spent 17 nonconsecutive weeks in the top 100, ending the year as the UK's 33rd-best-selling hit. The release of "Maria" came exactly 20 years after "Heart of Glass", Blondie's first UK number-one hit. Across the rest of Europe, "Maria" topped the charts in Greece and Spain and was a top-10 hit in Austria, Flanders, Germany, Iceland, Ireland, Sweden, and Switzerland. It additionally reached the top 20 in Italy and the Netherlands and attained a peak of number five on the Eurochart Hot 100.

"Maria" was not as successful in North America, stalling at number 82 on the US Billboard Hot 100 and number 43 on the Canadian RPM Top Singles chart; however, it did enter the top 20 on the Billboard Adult Top 40, Hot Dance Club Play, and Hot Dance Music/Maxi-Singles Sales charts. The single also underperformed in Australia, where it peaked at number 59, but fared better in New Zealand, reaching number 16 during its third week on the country's chart.

Music video
The music video for "Maria" was directed by Roman Coppola (credited as Alan Smithee), and takes place in New York City. Parts of New York through night-vision goggles are seen before zooming into an apartment where Blondie are performing the song. Mysterious dark-clothed individuals are seen around different buildings setting up surveillance equipment to monitor the band. Toward the end of the video, one of the dark-clothed individuals aims a sniper rifle towards lead singer Deborah Harry, and fires a bullet at her. In slow motion, the bullet smashes through a window, a light bulb and the microphone towards her, but Harry (moving in real time) simply plucks the bullet from the air before it hits her (perhaps tying into the theme of "no exit", the band's comeback album).

Track listings

US 12-inch single
A1. "Maria" (Soul Solution full remix)
A2. "Maria" (Soul Solution Bonus Beats)
B1. "Maria" (Talvin Singh remix)
B2. "Maria" (Talvin Singh Rhythmic remix edit)
B3. "Maria" (album version)

US maxi-CD single (The Remixes)
 "Maria" (Soul Solution full remix) – 9:27
 "Maria" (Talvin Singh remix) – 7:27
 "Maria" (Talvin Singh Rhythmic remix edit) – 4:39
 "Maria" (album version) – 4:51

UK CD single
 "Maria" (radio edit)
 "Maria" (Soul Solution remix radio edit)
 "Maria" (Talvin Singh remix edit)

UK cassette single
A. "Maria" (radio edit)
B. "Maria" (Soul Solution remix radio edit)

European CD single
 "Maria" (radio edit) – 4:09
 "Maria" (Talvin Singh Rhythmic remix) – 7:26

European limited-edition CD single
 "Maria" (radio edit)
 "Screaming Skin" (live)
 "In the Flesh" (live)

European maxi-CD single and Australian CD single
 "Maria" (radio edit) – 4:09
 "Maria" (Talvin Singh Rhythmic remix) – 7:26
 "Maria" (Soul Solution remix radio edit) – 4:08
 "Maria" (album version) – 4:51

Credits and personnel
Credits are lifted from the UK and US single liner notes.

Studios
 Recorded at Red Night Recording, Electric Lady Studios, Chung King House of Metal (New York City)
 Mixed at Encore Studios (Los Angeles)

Blondie
 Jimmy Destri – writing, keyboards
 Deborah Harry – vocals
 Chris Stein – guitar
 Clem Burke – drums

Additional musicians
 Leigh Foxx – bass guitar
 Paul Carbonara – guitar

Production
 Craig Leon – production, recording
 Cassell Webb – production assistance
 Mike Shipley – mixing
 Steve Hall – mastering
 Rob Roth – art direction, photography

Charts

Weekly charts

Year-end charts

Certifications

Release history

References

1999 singles
1999 songs
American power pop songs
Blondie (band) songs
Logic Records singles
Music videos credited to Alan Smithee
Number-one singles in Greece
Number-one singles in Scotland
Number-one singles in Spain
Song recordings produced by Craig Leon
Songs written by Jimmy Destri
UK Singles Chart number-one singles